Charles Clifford Curtis was a pioneering American photographer who is best remembered for his documentary photography of the logging industry in the Sierra Nevada mountains in the late 19th century. His photographs, which captured the felling of the famous Mark Twain Tree and the General Noble tree, helped to convince the public that these giant sequoias were not a hoax.  Curtis was well-known for his use of large plate photography, which allowed him to capture portraits of people and gatherings that were dwarfed by the scale of the giant trees. His images of logging crews working in the rugged terrain of Converse Basin are considered some of the most iconic and enduring images of the era.

Early life
C.C. Curtis was born in Marshalltown, Iowa, on May 28, 1862. He moved to California at the age of 19 and began his photography career as an apprentice in San Francisco. He quickly developed a passion for the craft and began traveling throughout the San Joaquin Valley with his bulky and heavy glass plate photography equipment, using a donkey as his mode of transportation.

He worked as an apprentice for nine months before his brother provided him with funding to purchase his own photo tent and equipment. Curtis set up base in Hanford and traveled from town to town, earning $1 for 8x10" portraits. He had natural eye for photography and was known for his ability to capture community settings and activities in his images.

In 1883, Curtis fell in love with Maria Dewey, who worked in a millinery shop in Porterville. The two were married on March 29, 1884, in Visalia and later moved to Traver where Curtis opened his own photography studio. Traver was a thriving community at the time, thanks to the Central Valley Irrigation Project and the wheat boom.

Kaweah Colony

In 1886, Curtis joined the Kaweah Colony, a group of socialists led by Burnette Haskell in San Francisco. The colony acquired land in the Giant Forest under the Timber and Stone Act, and Curtis and his wife Maria worked on the road crew building the first road from the San Joaquin Valley to the colony. However, the camp was dissolved by the end of 1887 due to challenges to their land claims by the General Land Office, and Curtis became disillusioned. He destroyed most of the glass plate photographs he had taken of the Kaweah Colony.

Comstock Mill 
After a brief visit to Big Stump Grove in 1887, the Curtis family returned to Traver for the winter. In 1888, Charles sold his photography studio and returned to Hanford with his family. That summer, they packed up their photography equipment and headed back to Big Stump.

Upon arriving at the Comstock Mill, located near today's Lake Sequoia and not far from the General Grant Tree in Kings Canyon National Park, the Curtis family set about building their own shelter. Charles built their home atop a giant sequoia stump that measured nearly 20 feet in diameter and was about ten feet off the ground, requiring a staircase to access it. This unique one-room cabin served as both a home and a photography studio for the family, and they lived there for the summer of 1888. The studio was located about 250 yards from the Mark Twain Tree.

During this time, Curtis photographed hundreds of people gathered around the General Grant Tree and other trees in the Grant Grove area, as visitors were interested in having their own photographs taken amongst the giant sequoias. These images were used to prove to the public the size of these trees, as some people were skeptical of their existence. This was the first time that Curtis was able to earn a living as a photographer and stay in one place. The Comstock Mill was abandoned in 1888.

Millwood 

In 1885, Hiram C. Smith and A.D. Moore established the Kings River Lumber Company in Millwood, a bustling lumber boomtown that became Curtis's next home in the mountains. He built his photography studio on top of a flat rock across from the Sequoia Hotel, where travelers often came to have their pictures taken by the nearby General Grant tree and the stumps of logged giant sequoias. The loggers had cut "picture trees" with unnecessarily large undercuts to serve specifically as photo backdrops. Between the years of 1887 and 1893, Curtis divided his time between photographing the mountains in the summer and the wheat fields of the San Joaquín Valley in the winter.

Exhibition trees

Mark Twain Tree 

In 1891, the American Museum of Natural History purchased the rights to cut down the Mark Twain Tree for display. Curtis photographed the entire process of this significant event, and his images went on to be exhibited at the museum, bringing him fame and financial success through the sale of photos of the tree.

General Noble Tree 

In 1892, Charles made an agreement with the Kings River Lumber Company to photograph the felling of another giant sequoia, the General Noble Tree for display at the World's Fair in Chicago. He traveled to the fair with plans to sell prints of the images he had taken of the process. However, upon arriving at the fair with fifty-thousand prints to sell, he was denied a vendor booth and was unable to recoup his significant investment. As a result, he returned home financially ruined.

Later life 
In early 1891, a group of former members of the Kaweah Colony, including Curtis, established another utopian experiment called the Esperanza Land Improvement Company in an area called Esperanza on the Kettleman Plains, located to the west of the Traver and Hanford area. After returning from the World's Fair in 1892, Curtis and his family lived on their property in Esperanza as wheat farmers and scaled down his photography business. They struggled financially during the depression of 1882–1885.

Eventually, Curtis moved to San Jose, California to work in a spice mill and later to San Francisco to work at the Folgers Coffee Company. He helped to save the Folgers factory during a fire caused by the 1906 earthquake. He eventually settled in Pasadena, where he lived until 1932 and worked as a produce buyer. In 1932, he and his wife Maria retired to Cottage Grove, Oregon. Maria passed away that year at the age of 68 after 48 years of marriage. Curtis remarried twice before passing away at the age of 93 in 1956.

Throughout his life, Curtis kept his glass plate negatives, which were later rescued and saved by his grandson, Charles Curtis Annand. Today, many of Curtis's prints are part of the collections of UCLA, the National Park Service, and the Library of Congress.

Image gallery

Bibliography

 McGee, Lizzie. Mills of the Sequoias, Visalia, California, Tulare County Historical Society, Historical Bulletin, March 1952

References

External links 
 Reedley Historical Society and Museum

19th-century American photographers
20th-century American photographers
Photographers from California
Landscape photographers
Nature photographers
 
History of the Sierra Nevada (United States)
1862 births
1956 deaths